Orthotylus jordii is a bug species from the Miridae family that is endemic to Spain. It is under the subgenus Parapachylops subspecies.

References

Insects described in 1955
Endemic fauna of Spain
Hemiptera of Europe
jordii